NGC 4875 is a lenticular galaxy located about 350 million light-years away in the constellation Coma Berenices. NGC 4875 was discovered by astronomer Guillaume Bigourdan on May 16, 1885. The galaxy is a member of the Coma Cluster.

See also 
 List of NGC objects (4001–5000)
 NGC 4873

References

External links

Coma Berenices
Coma Cluster
Lenticular galaxies
4875 
44640 
Astronomical objects discovered in 1885